A chemistry set is an educational toy enabling simple chemistry experiments.

Chemistry set may also refer to:

 The Chemistry Set (British band), London, England psych-pop band, 1988-present
 The Chemistry Set (American band), Dallas, Texas, mid-2000s